Fornaciari is an Italian surname. Notable people with the surname include:

Irene Fornaciari (born 1983), Italian singer-songwriter
Paolo Fornaciari (born 1971), Italian cyclist
Zucchero Fornaciari (born 1955), Italian singer-songwriter and musician

Italian-language surnames